Thomas Balla (born January 25, 1936) is an American former fencer. He competed in the team sabre event at the 1968 Summer Olympics.

References

External links
 

1936 births
Living people
American male sabre fencers
Olympic fencers of the United States
Fencers at the 1968 Summer Olympics
Fencers from Budapest
Hungarian emigrants to the United States
Pan American Games medalists in fencing
Pan American Games gold medalists for the United States
Fencers at the 1967 Pan American Games